A staycation (a portmanteau of "stay" and "vacation"), or holistay (a portmanteau of "holiday" and "stay"), is a period in which an individual or family stays home and participates in leisure activities within day trip distance of their home and does not require overnight accommodation. In British English the term has increasingly come to refer to domestic tourism: taking a holiday in one's own country as opposed to traveling abroad.

Common activities of a staycation include the use of a backyard pool, visits to local parks and museums, and attendance at local festivals and amusement parks. Some staycationers also like to follow a set of rules, such as setting a start and end date, planning ahead, and avoiding routine, with the goal of creating the feel of a traditional vacation.

Staycations achieved popularity in the U.S. during the financial crisis of 2007–2010. In 2020, staycations became common due to the COVID-19 pandemic.

Etymology
The word staycation is a portmanteau of stay (meaning stay-at-home) and vacation. The terms "holistay" and "daycation" are also sometimes used. The earliest references to this term as coming from a 2003 article by Terry Massey in The Sun News.
Hotel impresario Paul Ruffino  who is credited for coining the word "infomercial" has also been credited for his incarnation of the word. According to a Connecticut travel blog, the word "staycation" was originally coined by Canadian comedian Brent Butt in the television show Corner Gas, in the episode "Mail Fraud", which first aired October 24, 2005. The word became widely used in the United States during May 2008 as the summer travel season began with gas prices reaching record highs, leading many people to cut back on expenses including travel. Merriam-Webster cites the earliest use in the Cincinnati Enquirer, July 18, 1944.  However, it had already been published a few weeks earlier in another Cincinnati newspaper.

The term was added to the 2009 version of the Merriam–Webster's Collegiate Dictionary.

A closely related concept and term is nearcation, which is taking a vacation to a location relatively close to home. "Nearcation" and "staycation" may be used interchangeably since the travel destination may be in the same metropolitan region in which one resides and it is unclear how far away a destination needs to be until it becomes no longer a "staycation".

Lake Superior State University added the word to its 2009 List of Banished Words. The citation noted that vacation is not synonymous with travel, and thus a separate term isn't necessary to describe a vacation during which one stays at home.

Benefits
Staycations are likely to be less costly than a vacation involving traveling. There may be no lodging costs and travel expenses may be minimal. Costs may include transportation for local trips, dining, and local attractions.
According to the American Automobile Association, "the average North American vacation will cost $244 per day for two people for lodging and meals.... Add some kids and airfare, and a 10-day vacation could top $8,000."

Staycations are likely to avoid some of the stress associated with travel, such as jet lag, packing, long drives, or waits at airports.

Staycations may be of economic benefit to some local businesses, who get customers from the area providing them with business. In 2008, the tourism bureaus of many U.S. cities also began promoting staycations for their residents to help replace the tourism dollars lost from a drop in out-of-town visitors.

Air travel's environmental impact is significant. By avoiding travel, a staycation may reduce the carbon emissions associated with travel greatly.

Risks
As staycationers are close to their places of employment, they may be tempted to go to work at least part of the time, and their bosses may feel their employees are available to be called into work. Staycationers also have access to their email (whether personal or business) at home as they would regularly, allowing them to be contacted, and feeling the temptation to keep up with this contact (whether business or social). These risks can be balanced by strictly adhering to rules that make the experience feel like a real get-away, such as "no checking email," or "no watching television."

Staycationers may spend money they had not planned as retailers and other advertisers offer "deals" to encourage staycationers to spend money. These may include hotels making package deals in hopes of luring planned staycationers to do some travel. Staycationers can also finish a stay-at-home vacation feeling unsatisfied if they allow themselves to fall into their daily monotony and include household projects, errands, and other menial tasks in their vacation at home or near home.

See also
Day trip
Domestic tourism
Tourism

References

External links

2008 neologisms
2000s neologisms
Types of tourism
Tourist activities
Neologisms